League tables for teams participating in Kakkonen, the third tier of the Finnish football league system, in 2006.

League tables

Group A, East 

NB: JJK II (promoted from Division Three) withdrew and Ponnistus took their place.

Group B, West

Group C, North

Footnotes

References and sources
Finnish FA, Suomen Palloliitto 

Kakkonen seasons
3
Fin
Fin